Roberson is a patronymic surname and a variant of Robertson, derived from the given name Robert. Over the centuries, there have been many derivations of the Robertson surname, including Robason. The geographical origins of the surname Roberson is Scotland and northern England. Robertson is also a highland clan and also has many derivatives of the name.

Notable people with the name include:

 Anthony Roberson (born 1983), American basketball player
 André Roberson (born 1991), American basketball player
 Chris Roberson (disambiguation), several people
 Dante Roberson (born 1972), American drummer, musical director, and record producer 
 Darryl Roberson (born 1960), American Air Force officer
 Derick Roberson (born 1995), American football player
 Ell Roberson (born 1980), American football player
 Eric Roberson (born 1976), American singer, songwriter, and producer
 Jaquarii Roberson (born 1998), American football player
 Jennifer Roberson (born 1953), American author of fantasy and historical literature
 LaTavia Roberson (born 1981), American singer, songwriter, and actress
 Lee Roberson (1909–2007), American Baptist minister, founder of Tennessee Temple University
 Paula Roberson, American biostatistician
 Terrance Roberson (born 1976), American basketball player

See also
Robeson (disambiguation), includes a list of people with surname Robeson
Robertson (surname)
Robison (name)

References

Patronymic surnames